Shymkent International Airport  is an airport serving Shymkent, Kazakhstan. It features single passenger terminal and one runway. It serves as a hub for SCAT Airlines.

History 

The basis for the airport was an agricultural airbase built in 1932. From 1933, it started handling passengers and cargo traffic. In 1963, the airport was relocated to its current location; construction of both the runway and the passenger terminal was finished in 1967.

After a protocol signed in November 2012 by the governments of Kazakhstan and France, French forces withdrawing from Afghanistan received authorization to use Shymkent Airport. Military hardware arriving on French aircraft will then be transported by rail to Europe. France has to fund the creation of the infrastructure necessary for the temporary bond storage and the area needed for higher customs control to ensure the trans-shipment operations in Shymkent Airport.

In 2014, passenger traffic in this airport reached 440,000 passengers; in 2017, it reached 520,000.

Airlines and destinations

Passenger

Cargo

Accidents and incidents 
1996 Charkhi Dadri mid-air collision: On November 12, 1996, Kazakhstan Airlines Flight 1907, an IL-76TD which took off from Shymkent International Airport collided with Saudia Flight 763, a Boeing 747 which took off from Indira Gandhi International Airport, in the air over Charkhi Dadri, Haryana, India. All 289 passengers and 23 crew on Flight 763, and all 27 passengers and 10 crew on Flight 1907 were killed. A total of 349 people died, making it the deadliest ever mid-air collision involving two aircraft.

See also
Transport in Kazakhstan
List of the busiest airports in the former USSR

References

External links 
 Shymkent International Airport

Airports in Kazakhstan
Airports built in the Soviet Union
Shymkent
Transport in Shymkent